Cariñena may refer to :

Cariñena, Aragon, a village in the province of Zaragoza, in the autonomous community of Aragon, Spain
Cariñena (DO), a Spanish Denominación de Origen (DO) for wines located in Cariñena, Aragón
Cariñena (grape), a red Spanish/French wine grape variety

See also
Campo de Cariñena, a comarca in Spain with Cariñena, Aragon as its capital